, aka Moju the Blind Beast is a 1969 Japanese film directed by Yasuzo Masumura. It is based on a novel by Edogawa Rampo.

Plot

Young aspiring model Aki Shima is kidnapped by a mysterious blind man and taken to his home in a warehouse, which is filled with sculptures of human body parts and female figures. The blind man, Michio Sofu, is a sculptor who wishes to use Aki as an unwilling muse for his greatest work. As her time in captivity wears on, Aki soon becomes enraptured by her blind captor and the two soon become lovers, beginning a series of Sadomasochistic games. In the end Aki agrees to become something more than just the inspiration for his masterpiece, becoming the art piece itself, to which Michio agrees. After killing and dismembering Aki, Michio "sculpts" her corpse into a macabre work of art. Seeing his life's work complete, Michio then commits suicide.

Cast 
 Eiji Funakoshi as Michio Sofu
 Mako Midori as Aki Shima
 Noriko Sengoku as Shino, Mutter

Release

Blind Beast was released in Japan on January 25, 1969. The film was released by Daiei International Film with English subtitles in April 1969. It was reissued by Roninfilm under the title Warehouse in February 1974. It was released to Blu-ray in the United States from Arrow Films on August 24, 2021.

Reception
In a contemporary review, Variety praised the cinematography and Shigeo Mano's art direction, while noting that his previous films dealt with sexuality such as Daini no Seo and Manji but "these are kindergarten material compared with The Blind Beast...it's a sick film."

Retrospective reviews include critic Jasper Sharp calling it "One of the most fascinatingly freakish of all the big screen adaptations of the works of Japanese mystery writer Edogawa Rampo". Tom Vick of AllMovie compared the film to The Collector and opined that "Masumura, a master of dark humor and macabre psychodrama, strikes an odd balance between silliness and horror throughout the film. One of the nuttier entries in his oeuvre, Blind Beast is a delicious guilty pleasure." Sight & Sound referred to the film as a "fascinating curiosity" with "bizarre production design, tendency towards outlandish symbolism and eccentric performances, it seems at least partly tongue in cheek even at its most extreme."

See also
 List of Japanese films of 1969

References

Footnotes

Sources

External links 

Films directed by Yasuzo Masumura
1960s erotic thriller films
Japanese erotic thriller films
Films based on Japanese novels
Films based on works by Edogawa Ranpo
Daiei Film films
Films about blind people
1960s Japanese films
Films about disability
1960s Japanese-language films